In Greek mythology, Triopas or Triops (gen.: Τρίοπος) was the seventh king of Argos. Triopas may be an aspect of the Argive Zeus (sometimes represented with a third eye on his forehead), or may be his human representative.

Etymology 
The name's popular etymology is "he who has three eyes" (from τρι- "three" + -ωπ- "see") but the ending -ωψ, -οπος suggests a Pre-Greek origin.

Family 
Triopas belonged to the house of Phoroneus of Argos. According to Hyginus' Fabulae, he was the son of Piranthus and Callirhoe, brother of Argus and Arestorides and the father by Oreasis (Oreaside) of Xanthus and Inachus (probably Iasus). Eurisabe, Anthus, Pelasgus and Agenor were probably Triopas' sons when we took into account that Iasus was always called the brother of Pelasgus and Agenor even though their parentage was differently given. Alternatively, Triopas was also called the son of Phorbas and Euboea, brother of Arestor and father again of Pelasgus, Iasus, Agenor and a daughter Messene. In the latter case, among these children, the eldest were the twins Pelasgus and Iasus who were mothered by Sois.

Reign 
According to Eusebius, Triopas reigned for 46 years, in which Prometheus, Epimetheus, Atlas and Io lived during this time. He succeeded either his father Piranthus or Phorbas to the throne of Argos and was in turn replaced either by his son Iasus or Agenor, or by his grandson Crotopus (son himself of Agenor). Triopas was a contemporary of the autochthon Cecrops, first king of Athens and Marathonius, the thirteenth king of Sicyon.

Notes

References 
 Diodorus Siculus, The Library of History translated by Charles Henry Oldfather. Twelve volumes. Loeb Classical Library. Cambridge, Massachusetts: Harvard University Press; London: William Heinemann, Ltd. 1989. Vol. 3. Books 4.59–8. Online version at Bill Thayer's Web Site
 Diodorus Siculus, Bibliotheca Historica. Vol 1–2. Immanel Bekker. Ludwig Dindorf. Friedrich Vogel. in aedibus B. G. Teubneri. Leipzig. 1888–1890. Greek text available at the Perseus Digital Library.
 Gaius Julius Hyginus, Fabulae from The Myths of Hyginus translated and edited by Mary Grant. University of Kansas Publications in Humanistic Studies. Online version at the Topos Text Project.
 Pausanias, Description of Greece with an English Translation by W.H.S. Jones, Litt.D., and H.A. Ormerod, M.A., in 4 Volumes. Cambridge, MA, Harvard University Press; London, William Heinemann Ltd. 1918. Online version at the Perseus Digital Library
 Pausanias, Graeciae Descriptio. 3 vols. Leipzig, Teubner. 1903.  Greek text available at the Perseus Digital Library.

Princes in Greek mythology
Kings of Argos
Inachids
Argive characters in Greek mythology
Mythology of Argos